Kate Botello is a former American television personality best known for her work on the San Francisco, California-based ZDTV (later known as TechTV and then as G4).

Career

She began her television career in 1998 co-hosting the technology-oriented television program The Screen Savers alongside Leo Laporte. In 1999, Botello and Laporte were described as "the two most popular personalities on the only 24-hour national cable channel devoted exclusively to computers and the Internet". When the pair appeared at a promotional event in York, Pennsylvania that year: "Geeks swarmed the local electronics store where Kate Botello and Leo Laporte were signing autographs. Security had to be called to help guide the two computer advice experts to their car."

In 2000, Botello left The Screen Savers to co-host GameSpot TV, a video game review show, with Adam Sessler.  In February 2001, the show was renamed Extended Play.  She also co-hosted a TechTV video on computer basics with Chris Pirillo.

Botello left TechTV in 2002 and moved to Brooklyn, New York where she worked on Broadway as a freelance actor, singer and playwright.  In her time there, she starred Off-Broadway as Judy Garland in the cabaret musical, Judy Garland and the Uninvited Company and the annual holiday musical, Judy's Christmas Garland.  The cabaret show later toured other cities. A critic wrote that "Botello nails Garland's familiar speaking voice, singing voice and facial expressions".

In November 2005, Botello moved to Traverse City, Michigan where she and Raymond Weigel founded Traverse City Web Design.

In June 2011, Botello began hosting Weird News Radio, a weekly audio podcast, with Jim Harold. She is also on the air from 7 to 10 am Eastern on "Classical IPR", part of Interlochen Public Radio, WIAA (FM), Interlochen, Michigan. Her latest endeavor is "Showtunes with Kate Botello" airing on Classical IPR, Sunday evenings at 7 pm EST.

References

External links
 A Fond Farewell From Kate Botello
 WeirdNewsRadio.com
 
 Traverse City Web Design
 Search results for Botello on the web site of La Voz... México
 The New Screen Savers 52: Kate Botello Returns!

Living people
American dramatists and playwrights
TechTV people
X-Play
Year of birth missing (living people)